Barbara K. Charbonneau-Dahlen PhD, RN, is a Pembina Chippewa advocating for those who have experienced sexual abuse. She filed a suit alleging abuse at St. Paul's Indian Mission School, in Marty, South Dakota. She holds both a Bachelor's and master's degree from University of North Dakota (UND). She has also completed the Family Nurse Practitioner certification program at UND. She currently works at Minnesota State University Mankato in the School of Nursing.

She received ANA's 2002 Research Practice Award for her study, "Problems and Resources of American Indian Elders." She developed the Dream Catcher/Medicine Wheel Model which was implemented to recruit nurses through the Retention of American Indians into Nursing (RAIN) Program at the University of North Dakota.

Published work

Further reading 
 For Native American Clergy Sex Abuse Survivors, Justice is Elusive
 Panel rejects Native American boarding school victims' bill
 Women's History: Native Americans

References 

Year of birth missing (living people)
Living people
Ojibwe people
Minnesota State University, Mankato faculty
Sexual abuse victim advocates
University of North Dakota alumni